Dayse Figueiredo (born ) is a Brazilian female volleyball player.

With her club SESI-SP she competed at the 2014 FIVB Volleyball Women's Club World Championship.

References

External links
 profile at FIVB.org

1984 births
Living people
Brazilian women's volleyball players
Place of birth missing (living people)
Wing spikers